Commondale is a railway station on the Esk Valley Line, which runs between Middlesbrough and Whitby via Nunthorpe. It is owned by Network Rail and managed by Northern Trains.

History
Even though the line through Commondale was opened in April 1861, it would be some years before the North Eastern Railway furnished the remote dale with a station. As the area was populated with small hamlets mostly engaged in agriculture, no station was provided immediately, but a siding was furnished for the Cleveland Fire Brick & Pottery Company (CFBaPC). The CFBaPC attracted a workforce which led to a significant rise in the population, which in turn prompted a station to be built in 1891. Previous to this, a signal box had been installed to control the west facing branch to the brickworks and the junction was used to board passengers with the name of Commondale Siding being used as a station name. Records indicate that in 1885, six years before Commondale was given full official station status, 3,555 passenger tickers were sold totalling a revenue of £99.

Even with the increased population, passenger numbers were low and apart from the freight siding, the station did not handle any goods during its lifetime. The station became the first in the area to become an unstaffed halt; this was effective from 16 January 1950.

The single platform, on the northern side of the line, has a single brick building, in the same style as other buildings in the hamlet, as opposed to stone built buildings at most other places on the line.

Services

As of the May 2021 timetable change, the station is served by four trains per day towards Whitby, and Middlesbrough via Nunthorpe. Most trains continue to Newcastle via Hartlepool. All services are operated by Northern Trains.

Notes

References

Sources

External links
 
 

Railway stations in the Borough of Scarborough
DfT Category F2 stations
Former North Eastern Railway (UK) stations
Railway stations in Great Britain opened in 1861
Northern franchise railway stations
1861 establishments in England